County Route 33 is a  south–north county route in the central part of Rockland County, New York. Prior to 1970, portions of CR 33 were designated as the old route of New York State Route 304. Today, CR 33 serves as an alternative route for NY 304 from Pearl River to New City where NY 304 ends at US 9W. North of New City, CR 33 serves as an alternative route for the US 9W/US 202 multiplex in northern Rockland County.

CR 33 is the longest county route in Rockland, and in fact is longer than all NY state routes within the county except for NY 59 (only shorter by three-quarters of a mile). CR 33 intersects several major west–east roads within the county. It even intersects the Palisades Interstate Parkway at exit 10 in New City. CR 33 has one present child-route in CR 33A in Nanuet, and until recently had three with CR 33B located in New City and CR 33C located in Stony Point.

Route description

CR 33 begins at CR 30 in Pearl River, and ends at CR 106 (Old NY 210) in Stony Point. CR 33 runs through Pearl River, Nanuet, New City, Garnerville, and Stony Point. CR 33 is an alternate route for NY 304 from Pearl River to New City, and an alternate route for US 9W/US 202 from Garnerville to Stony Point. Between New City and Garnerville, CR 33 goes up Hi-Tor Mountain through Hi-Tor State Park. Unlike most of the county routes in Rockland, CR 33 runs through many business areas. It cuts through downtown Garnerville, Nanuet, and Pearl River. In fact, CR 33 is a primary access road for The Shops at Nanuet. Only in New City does CR 33 serve really as a residential road.

CR 33 begins at CR 30 in Pearl River just north of the New Jersey border. CR 33 begins at the Middletown Road/Central Ave terminus near Pearl River High School where it runs north through the northern portions of Pearl River. CR 33 serves as the primary road throughout business areas of Pearl River. CR 33 then intersects NY 304 in Pearl River and heads north into Nanuet.

Like in Pearl River, CR 33 splits downtown Nanuet with intersections with CR 42, CR 46, and its child-route, CR 33A. Here CR 33 is still named Middletown Road, but it is also considered Main Street within the business district of Nanuet. As CR 33 leaves downtown Nanuet, it has a rather busy intersection with NY 59. This is because The Shops at Nanuet and the Rockland Plaza strip mall are located at this intersection. After this intersection, CR 33 proceeds north into residential areas of Nanuet running parallel to NY 304. Here it meets CR 60 at Smith Road.

As CR 33 enters New City it has its intersection with the Palisades Interstate Parkway at exit 10. This intersection is rather large as it also includes Germonds Road and West Clarkstown Road, which are major roads in New City. As CR 33 crosses the PIP, it changes from Middletown Road into Little Tor Road. It then proceeds north into residential New City with intersections with CR 76 and CR 80. Its intersection with CR 80 marks the intersection with the two longest county routes in Rockland. CR 33 continues north through New City for another  before beginning its trek through Hi-Tor State Park. CR 33 spends two miles (3 km) climbing and descending Hi-Tor Mountain. At its summit, drivers going southbound can see into New York City on a clear day. As CR 33 leaves Hi-Tor Park it enters the village of Garnerville.

Here, CR 33 intersects and joins US 202 for a third of a mile before turning north. It crosses CR 94 in downtown Garnerville. In fact, this used to be the former eastern terminus of CR 94, until it was extended beyond US 9W/US 202 in West Haverstraw. CR 33 then proceeds into the town of Stony Point for the final mile and a half of its run. It intersects CR 98 and CR 100 before coming to an end at CR 106. It really would be impossible to extend CR 33 further north as Bear Mountain State Park lies close to its northern terminus.

History
Prior to 1970, portions of CR 33 were designated as the old route of NY 304. Also, the section between CR 94 and CR 106, known locally as Central Highway, was once the rail bed of the New Jersey & New York Railroad Line spur ending at Stony Point Station.

Suffixed routes
CR 33A- Route 33A is a  spur from CR 33 to CR 46 along Old Middletown Road in Nanuet.
CR 33B- Route 33B was a  business route that began and ended at CR 33 in New City. It ran along Old Middletown Road and the western terminus of Kings Highway.
CR 33C- Route 33C was barely a  spur from CR 33 to a dead end along an extension of Central Highway in Stony Point.

Major intersections

References

External links 

033